Bezora is a hamlet in Fianarantsoa Province, Madagascar; the nearest settlement is Sahasinaka. It consists of a road junction, a settlement in the fork of the junction, forest, and fields.

References 

Populated places in Fianarantsoa Province